Jack Cahalane (born 2002) is an Irish Gaelic footballer and hurler who plays for club sides St Finbarr's and Castlehaven and at senior level with the Cork county football team. He usually lines out as a forward.

Career
Cahalane played as a dual player at school level with Coláiste an Spioraid Naoimh, while also lining out at juvenile and underage levels with the St. Finbarr's and Castlehaven clubs. He made his senior debut in both codes in 2020. Cahalane first played at inter-county level with Cork as a dual minor in 2018 and ended his time in this grade with an All-Ireland MFC title. He later won consecutive All-Ireland U20C titles with the Cork under-20 hurling team. Cahalane was added to the Cork senior football team for the 2022 McGrath Cup.

Personal life
His father, Niall Cahalane, and his uncle, John Cleary, won All-Ireland SFC medals as members of the Cork senior football team in 1989 and 1990. Cahalane's aunt, Nollaig Cleary, won nine All-Ireland medals with Cork. His brothers, Conor and Damien Cahalane, have also played for Cork.

Career statistics

Honours

St. Finbarr's
Cork Premier Senior Hurling Championship: 2022

Cork
All-Ireland Under-20 Hurling Championship: 2020, 2021
Munster Under-20 Hurling Championship: 2020, 2021
Munster Under-20 Football Championship: 2021
All-Ireland Minor Football Championship: 2019

References

2002 births
Living people
St Finbarr's hurlers
Castlehaven Gaelic footballers
Cork inter-county hurlers
Cork inter-county Gaelic footballers
Dual players